Lebeda brauni is a moth of the family Lasiocampidae first described by Yves de Lajonquière in 1979. It is found on Borneo, Peninsular Malaysia and Sumatra.

External links

Lasiocampinae
Moths described in 1979